Aurélien Rousseau (born 25 June 1976) is a French civil servant. In May 2022, he became Chief of Staff to Prime Minister Élisabeth Borne.

Personal life 
Rousseau is in a relationship with Marguerite Cazeneuve.

References 

1976 births
Living people
Knights of the Ordre national du Mérite
French civil servants
École nationale d'administration alumni
People from Alès